{{Infobox television station
| callsign               = KDKF
| above                  = Satellite of KDRV
| city                   =
| logo                   = 
| branding               = see KDRV infobox
| digital                = 29 (UHF)
| virtual                = 31
| translators            = 
| affiliations           = 31.1: ABC31.2: Antenna TV31.3: True Crime Network
| subchannels            = 
| network                = 
| founded                = 
| airdate                = 
| last_airdate           = 
| location               = Klamath Falls, Oregon
| country                = United States
| callsign_meaning       = KDRV Klamath Falls
| former_callsigns       = 
| former_channel_numbers = Analog:31 (UHF, 1989–2009)
| owner                  = Allen Media Broadcasting| licensee               = Oregon TV License Company LLC
| sister_stations        = see KDRV infobox
| former_affiliations    = 
| erp                    = 4.87 kW
| haat                   = 
| class                  = 
| facility_id            = 60740
| coordinates            = 
| licensing_authority    = FCC
| website                =  
}}
KDRV (channel 12) is a television station in Medford, Oregon, United States, affiliated with ABC. The station is owned by Allen Media Broadcasting, and maintains studios on Knutson Avenue (near Rogue Valley International–Medford Airport) in north Medford; its transmitter is located at the edge of Wolf Creek Park in rural northeastern Josephine County (near Golden).

KDKF (channel 31) in Klamath Falls operates as a full-time satellite of KDRV; this station's transmitter is located atop Stukel Mountain. KDKF covers areas of southwest/south-central Oregon that receive a marginal to a non-existent over-the-air signal from KDRV, although there is significant overlap between the two stations' contours otherwise. KDKF is a straight simulcast of KDRV; on-air references to KDKF are limited to Federal Communications Commission (FCC)-mandated hourly station identifications during newscasts and other programming. Aside from the transmitter, KDKF does not maintain any physical presence locally in Klamath Falls.

History

Prior to 1984, KOBI (channel 5) served as the primary ABC affiliate for southern Oregon and extreme northern California, but Medford was only partially covered. Viewers in some areas of southern Oregon could also receive KATU from Portland on cable. By this time, the Medford–Klamath Falls–Yreka market was one of the few markets in the country without full network service. This was partly because the channel 8 construction permit, KSYS, was transferred to an educational permittee. When the FCC changed channel 8's status to reserved noncommercial in late 1977, it allocated channel 12 to Medford "to provide a third VHF network service".

Four groups filed for the new channel 12 allocation: Christian Broadcasting Corporation, Highland Communications, Sunshine Television, and Medford Channel 12 Limited Partnership. The parties entered into a settlement agreement in September 1982 that granted Sunshine the construction permit.

KDRV signed on for the first time on February 26, 1984, having missed a deadline to broadcast the 1984 Winter Olympics. The station's studio had not been finished yet, and live local programming was not possible from its temporary studio. The new studio was finished later in 1984, and the station was able to begin news and other local programming a year later. Sunshine sold the station to Love Broadcasting in 1987 and signed on KDKF on October 17, 1989. Chambers Communications bought the station in 1994.

Until 2007, KDRV was one of the few television stations still using the U-Matic videotape format for editing and on-air playback.

On March 5, 2014, Chambers Communications announced that it would exit broadcasting and sell its stations to Heartland Media, a company owned by former Gray Television executive Bob Prather. The sale was completed on July 15. Heartland recently added Chico, California CBS affiliate KHSL-TV to its family of stations, making KDRV and KEZI their new sister stations.

KDRV-DT2
KDRV-DT2, branded on air as KDRV Classics, is the Antenna TV-affiliated second digital subchannel of KDRV and KDKF, broadcasting in standard definition on channel 12.2 over KDRV and channel 31.2 over KDKF.

History
KDRV launched a digital subchannel on virtual channel 12.2 on February 28, 2011, as a 24-hour news broadcast service branded as NewsWatch 12+ Nonstop News. The subchannel originally featured a mix of simulcasts of KDRV's live NewsWatch 12 newscasts in their scheduled time periods as well as rebroadcasts of the previously aired edition on a repetitive cycle until the next live airing. To comply with educational programming requirements for digital multicast services included in the Children's Television Act, NewsWatch 12+ also aired three hours of compliant E/I programming aimed at older children and teenagers on Saturday afternoons (initially consisting of six back-to-back episodes of Jack Hanna's Animal Adventures, then from September 3, 2011 onward, other syndicated series compliant with the regulations such as Danger Rangers and Exploration with Richard Wiese).

On September 2, 2011, KDRV began airing weekly high school football games each Friday evening at 7:00 p.m. (branded as the Friday Night Blitz Game of the Week, after the football highlight show that airs on KDRV/KDKF's main feed on Fridays during the 11:00 p.m. newscast). On January 3, 2012, KDRV-DT2 began airing the Roundball Wrap Game of the Week (named after the high school basketball highlight show aired during the late newscast during the winter and early spring), a showcase of select local high school basketball games that aired in various time periods depending on the scheduled telecast. Play-by-play commentary for the games was handled by Bill Jacobs (and were simulcast with ESPN Radio affiliate KTMT [580 AM]) with reporter Steven Sandberg as an occasional fill-in, while Chris Leone and Chris Breece handled color analysis (sports reporter Brandon Kamerman replaced Breece in 2012; Jacobs—now the voice of the Southern Oregon University Raiders football and basketball teams—was replaced by Sandberg in 2013).

On September 9, 2013, KDRV discontinued the news rebroadcast format and affiliated the DT2 feed with "Live Well Network Southern Oregon," serving as an affiliate of the Walt Disney Television-owned/ABC Owned Television Stations-operated, lifestyle-oriented Live Well Network (now Localish). On October 27, 2014, the day after Live Well Network relegated its distribution exclusively to ABC's eight owned-and-operated stations, KDRV affiliated the DT2 subchannel with classic television network Antenna TV (under the branding "KDRV Classics"). As it did following the conversion to Live Well, the station continues to carry the Friday Night Blitz and Roundball Wrap Games of the Week on KDRV-DT2 during their corresponding high school sports seasons, which mainly preempts the network's prime time schedule.

Local programming
Dancing with the Rogue Valley Stars
Since 2009, NewsWatch 12 airs a one-hour televised special called Dancing with the Rogue Valley Stars, which raises money for local charities and is sponsored by USA Dance Southern Oregon and Southern Oregon Sparrow Clubs in association with KDRV. Patterned after ABC's highly rated and successful Dancing with the Stars, the competition featured popular local personalities and officials dancing various styles of dance.1st ever Dancing with the Rogue Valley Stars a success  In 2010, KDRV's Ashley Hall participated in the event dancing the salsa.Preparations begin for Dancing with the Rogue Valley Stars In 2011, KDRV's Kaylin Krashesky and Kristin Ketchell participated with Kaylin dancing the west coast swing and Kristin dancing the samba. (Krashesky placed 3rd in people's and judges' voting.) In 2012, sports director Chris Leone and news anchor Erin Maxson represented the station as contestants with Leone dancing the salsa and Maxson dancing the western two-step. (Maxson placed 3rd in the people's voting and 2nd in the judges' voting.) In 2013, weekend anchor Christy Lewis and weekday meteorologist Alyssa Caroprese were chosen to represent the station as contestants for the 5th annual event.

Extreme Makeover: Home Edition – Southern Oregon
In 2011, NewsWatch 12 aired an award-winning 30-minute special called Extreme Makeover: Home Edition – Southern Oregon, a behind-the-scenes look at an episode of ABC's Extreme Makeover: Home Edition when the show selected C.J. and Lindsay McPhail, founders of the Southern Oregon Sparrow Clubs and parents of three children (two diagnosed with autism) to have their home torn down and rebuilt. News anchors Brian Morton and Danielle Craig led the hosting duties. The special was produced by Erin Maxson.

News operation
KDRV presently broadcasts 36 hours of locally produced newscasts each week (with six hours each weekday and three hours each on Saturdays and Sundays).

Launched on September 16, 1985, KDRV has a fully staffed news department known as NewsWatch 12. By the mid-1990s, it had shot to first place in the Medford–Klamath Falls market, and has stayed at the top for most of the last two decades. Like fellow stations KOBI and KTVL, they air newscasts at 5 p.m., 6 p.m. and 11 p.m. but beginning in 2013, weekend newscasts began airing at 8:00 a.m., 5:00, 6:00, 6:30 and 11 p.m. unlike its rivals. KDRV airs its morning news starting at 5 a.m. (as does KTVL). Anchor and reporter Ron Brown (Known as the "Dean of News Anchors" in Southern Oregon) and Chief Meteorologist Scott Lewis were the longest-tenured newscasters in the station's history, but Lewis retired in 2012 and Brown retired in May 2015. Anchor Brian Morton (who joined the station in 1995) succeeded Brown as KDRV's longest tenured anchor. Brown hosted the weekly "Oregon Trails" segment, which took a look back in Southern Oregon's history, while Morton reports on "Wednesday's Child", an adoption segment.  The newscast has received numerous awards, including several National Association of Broadcasters, Associated Press and Emmy Awards. For a short period of time, KDRV was the only station in the Medford market to continue airing local sportscasts while rival stations KTVL and KOBI dropped their sportscasts in 2009. This has since changed.

On January 5, 2011, NewsWatch 12 was the first station in the market to begin broadcasting its newscasts in 16:9 widescreen to coincide with its new look, which is similar to sister station KEZI in Eugene. The station is also the first in the market to broadcast commercials in high definition. On September 9, 2013, KDRV added yet another newscast to its daily schedule known as NewsWatch 12 Midday, which airs Monday through Friday at 11:00 a.m.

Notable former on-air staff
 Walt Maciborski – news anchor

Technical information

Subchannels
The stations' digital signals are multiplexed:

Analog-to-digital conversion
Both stations shut down their analog signals, respectively on February 17, 2009, the original target date in which full-power television stations in the United States were to transition from analog to digital broadcasts under federal mandate (which was later pushed back to June 12, 2009). The station's digital channel allocations post-transition are as follows:
 KDRV shut down its analog signal, over VHF channel 12; the station's digital signal relocated from its pre-transition UHF channel 38 to VHF channel 12 for post-transition operations.
 KDKF shut down its analog signal, over UHF channel 31; the station's digital signal remained on its pre-transition UHF channel 29, using PSIP to display the station's virtual channel as its former UHF analog channel 31.

Translators
KDRV is rebroadcast on the following digital translator stations:

Carriage disputes
Dispute with Dish Network
On December 10, 2010, KDRV announced on its newscast that its owner Chambers Communications and Dish Network could not come to a long-term agreement to keep the station on the air in the Medford market and were in danger of losing local ABC programming as a result. Viewers were encouraged to read a special Q&A page regarding this matter. Despite their best efforts, their previous agreement expired on December 15 and the stations were removed from the Dish Network local line-ups. Chambers and Dish finally came to an agreement to resume service and on December 30, 2010, the stations returned on Dish Network.

KDRV replaces KRCR on Mt. Shasta cable
In January 2012, KDRV replaced Redding, California ABC affiliate KRCR-TV on Northland Communications cable channel 7 in Mt. Shasta, California as Northland and KRCR severed ties after failing to come to a mutual agreement to continue coverage on the Mt. Shasta cable system.  Thus, Northland placed KDRV in the channel 7 slot.Northland pulls KRCR Channel 7 off air in Siskiyou; affiliate out of Oregon takes its spot, David Benda, Redding.com(Redding Record Searchlight), January 12, 2012

Despite being in California, Siskiyou County is technically (yet officially) part of the Medford DMA according to the FCC. Both KRCR and Northland made several attempts to get the DMA changed, but were unsuccessful each time. KHSL-TV, KNVN-TV and KIXE-TV are the only'' Chico–Redding market stations airing on the Northland system in Mt. Shasta; however, certain programs on KHSL and KNVN are subject to blackout due to the FCC's network non-duplication and syndication exclusivity rules.

KDRV had been on Northland's Yreka cable system on channel 12 since the station launched in early 1984 and the advent of local cable television back in the early to mid 1980s.

References

External links

History of Television in Southern Oregon

Entertainment Studios
Television channels and stations established in 1984
1984 establishments in Oregon
ABC network affiliates
Antenna TV affiliates
True Crime Network affiliates
DRV